Eureka Dome is a mountain in the Ogilvie Mountains of Yukon, Canada. The trail for the Yukon Quest 1,000-mile sled dog race passes over the mountain every February.

References

One-thousanders of Yukon
Yukon Quest